Saint-Dizier-les-Domaines is a commune in the Creuse department in central France.

Geography
The river Petite Creuse forms part of the commune's northeastern border.

Population

See also
Communes of the Creuse department

References

Communes of Creuse